Gauthier Gallon (born 23 April 1993) is a French professional footballer who plays as a goalkeeper for Ligue 1 club Troyes.

References

1993 births
Living people
French footballers
Association football goalkeepers
Ligue 2 players
Championnat National 3 players
Nîmes Olympique players
US Orléans players
ES Troyes AC players